The Coalition of Congolese Democrats, also known as CODECO, is a political party in the Democratic Republic of Congo. The party won 10 out of 500 seats in the 2006 parliamentary elections.  In the 19 January 2007 Senate elections, the party won out 1 of 108 seats.

References

Political parties in the Democratic Republic of the Congo